Halimah Yacob  (born 23 August 1954) is a Singaporean politician and former lawyer who has been serving as the eighth president of Singapore since 2017. Prior to her presidency, she served as the speaker of Parliament between 2013 and 2017. She is the first female president in Singapore's history.

A former member of the governing People's Action Party (PAP), she was the Member of Parliament (MP) representing the Bukit Batok East ward of Jurong GRC between 2001 and 2015, and the Marsiling division of Marsiling–Yew Tee GRC between 2015 and 2017.

After an amendment was made to the Constitution in 2017, the 2017 presidential election was specifically reserved for candidates from the Malay community. Halimah resigned from the PAP and became an independent—one of the qualifications needed to run for the presidency—and ran for the 2017 presidential election which she won in an uncontested election, after the other candidates except for her did not meet the qualifications.

Early life and education
Halimah was born on 23 August 1954 at her family home on Queen Street in Singapore, to an Indian father and Malay mother. Her father was a watchman who died due to a heart attack when she was eight years old, leaving her and four siblings to be brought up by her mother. Her family was in poverty at the time of her father's death, and she helped her mother to sell nasi padang outside the former Singapore Polytechnic (now Bestway Building) along Prince Edward Road.

She attended Singapore Chinese Girls' School and Tanjong Katong Girls' School before graduating from the University of Singapore (now National University of Singapore) in 1978 with a Bachelor of Laws degree and was called to the Singapore Bar in 1981. She subsequently went on to complete a Master of Laws degree at the National University of Singapore in 2001, and was conferred an honorary Doctor of Laws degree by the National University of Singapore on 7 July 2016.

Career
Halimah began her career working as a legal officer at the National Trades Union Congress (NTUC), before becoming the director of its legal services department in 1992. She was later appointed as a director of the Singapore Institute of Labour Studies (now Ong Teng Cheong Labour Leadership Institute) in 1999.

Political career
Halimah made her political debut in the 2001 general election as part of a five-member PAP team contesting in Jurong GRC and won.

Following the 2001 general election, Halimah was appointed Minister of State for Community Development, Youth and Sports. Following a Cabinet reshuffle in November 2012, she was appointed Minister of State for Social and Family Development. She had also served as Chairperson of the Jurong Town Council.

In January 2015, Halimah was co-opted into the PAP's Central Executive Committee (CEC), the party's highest decision-making body.

During the 2015 general election, she contested in the newly created Marsiling–Yew Tee GRC.

As Member of Parliament, Halimah has spoken out actively against Islamic extremism, in particular condemning and disassociating from the Islamic State of Iraq and Levant.

Speaker of Parliament
On 8 January 2013, Prime Minister Lee Hsien Loong nominated Halimah to succeed Michael Palmer as Speaker of Parliament following Palmer's resignation after he was revealed to have had an extramarital affair. Halimah was elected Speaker on 14 January 2013, the first woman to hold the post in Singapore's history.

Trade union involvement
Halimah served at the National Trades Union Congress (NTUC) as Deputy Secretary-General, Director of the Legal Services Department and Director of the Women's Development Secretariat. She had also served as Executive Secretary of the United Workers of Electronics and Electrical Industries.

Halimah was elected as the Workers' Vice-chairperson of the Standards Committee of the International Labour Conference (ILC) in Geneva from 2000 to 2002 and in 2005. Between 2003 and 2004, she was the Workers' Spokesperson for the ILC Committee on Human Resources Development and Training.

2017 presidential election

Speculation and announcement
While speaking during the debate on the Presidential Elections Amendment Bill on 6 February 2017, Minister in the Prime Minister's Office Chan Chun Sing addressed Halimah as "Madam President" twice instead of "Madam Speaker", drawing laughter from the PAP MPs and leading to widespread speculation that Halimah would be the party's preferred candidate for the reserved presidential elections.

On 6 August 2017, Halimah announced that she would be stepping down as Speaker of Parliament and MP of Marsiling–Yew Tee the next day to run for the presidency in the 2017 presidential election, which was reserved for members of the Malay community. She was widely viewed as the PAP's candidate for the election, and was endorsed by Prime Minister Lee Hsien Loong.

In an interview published on 11 August 2017, Halimah gave her views on the reserved presidential election. She said that it "shows we don't only talk about multiracialism, but we talk about it in the context of meritocracy or opportunities for everyone, and we actually practise it". Although some commentators have felt that the reserved election did not promote meritocracy, Halimah rejected that view, as she described, "All candidates have to qualify ... If we weaken eligibility criteria for those taking part in a reserved election, yes, then we are compromising meritocracy for representation. We are not - the same criteria apply to everybody". Regarding commentators who have questioned the lower qualifying bar for public sector candidates like herself, Halimah said, "It is an open, transparent system ... has been in place since 1991".

Campaign
On 25 August 2017, Halimah launched her official campaign website, including her campaign slogan "Do Good Do Together", which was criticised by many for being ungrammatical. She defended her slogan, explaining that it is meant to be catchy. In response to public queries whether Halimah broke election rules by campaigning ahead of the nomination day, the Elections Department clarified that its rule which forbids candidates from campaigning before close of nomination only applies to candidates who are nominated.

Halimah's campaign expenses reached only $220,875 out of the $754,982.40 legal limit. Her expenses were used for promotional material, room rental, office supplies, food, transport and phone bills. Queries were also raised regarding Halimah's long affiliation with the PAP and perceived lack of political independence as she quit the party just one month ago to campaign in the election. Halimah responded by comparing herself to former President Ong Teng Cheong, who was also a PAP member before being elected. She also cited that she had abstained from voting in an amendment for the Human Organ Transplant Act in 2007.

Former NMP Calvin Cheng suggested that Halimah does not appear to have the professional experience needed to manage the financial reserves. According to Publichouse.sg's estimate, her financial management involvement is only about $40 million, much less than the stringent $500 million shareholders’ equity requirement for private sector candidates.

Election
Being the only candidate to be issued a Certificate of Eligibility, Halimah became the eighth President of Singapore. Tan Cheng Bock, a former presidential candidate, wrote that Halimah "will occupy the most controversial presidency in the history of Singapore." The Economist described her as "popular and able". She is also the nation's first female President and Southeast Asia's fourth female Head of State after Corazon Aquino and Gloria Macapagal Arroyo of the Philippines and Megawati Sukarnoputri of Indonesia.

Reactions 
Halimah's sudden resignation as sole minority MP in Marsiling–Yew Tee GRC has sparked calls among the opposition for a by-election as the purpose of GRC is to ensure minority representation. The PAP government refused to hold a by-election, culminating in the filing of a lawsuit by Wong Souk Yee, a resident in the GRC. A hearing was set for 15 January 2018.

On 13 September 2017, the Singapore Democratic Party (SDP) filed a lawsuit in the High Court against the PAP government for refusing to call a by-election in Marsiling–Yew Tee GRC following Halimah's resignation from her post as the sole minority MP in her constituency.

In a High Court hearing conducted on 23 January 2018, Wong's lawyer, Peter Low, argued that the Parliamentary Elections Act should be interpreted such that all MPs of the group representation constituency have to leave their spots when one or more seats are left empty, or when only one remaining MP is a minority candidate. He cited Article 49 (1) of the Constitution, which states that when "the seat of a Member… has become vacant for any reason other than a dissolution of Parliament, the vacancy shall be filled by election" to support his argument.

After the Elections Department announced that Halimah was the only possible candidate for the presidency, global media monitoring house Meltwater observed a significant increase in negative sentiment on social media surrounding the Presidential Elections from 11 to 12 September 2017. The data shows 83% of negative sentiment and 17% of positive sentiment. Following the announcement, a number of Singaporeans began using the hashtag #NotMyPresident on Facebook and Twitter to voice their disappointment. In response, The Straits Times reported that there was the use of #halimahismypresident by an "equally vocal group", urging "Singaporeans to rally round their next president".

Halimah's decision to remain staying in her public housing HDB flat at Yishun raised security concerns. On 2 October 2017, Halimah accepted the government's decision to move her out of her Yishun flat to a more secure location. The government keeps track on the residence and security arrangements for her as well.

Presidency (2017–present)

Halimah was sworn on 14 September 2017 as the president of Singapore at The Istana. She was ex officio appointed Chancellor of the National University of Singapore and the Nanyang Technological University.

Halimah made her first state visit as president to Brunei on 11 May 2018, where she witnessed the signing of a financial technology agreement and a memorandum of understanding (MOU) to exchange information related to money laundering and terrorist financing between Singapore and Brunei. At the invitation of King Willem-Alexander of the Netherlands, Halimah was the first president of Singapore to visit the Netherlands since the establishment of diplomatic relations between both countries on 7 December 1965. The visit took place from 20 to 24 November 2018.

In September 2019, Halimah oversaw the signing of eight memorandums with the Philippines, allowing Singaporean companies and small and medium-sized enterprises to expand in the areas of data protection, science and technology and skills training and development of human resources.

Advocate for gender equality
In 2019, Halimah advocated for companies to embrace gender equality, noting that it will increase innovation and business profitability during her speech at the Women's Forum Asia. She had also publicly voiced her views about a local podcast, Okletsgo, for their offensive remarks against women and asked the hosts of the show for an apology for their remarks.

COVID-19 response
In April 2020, in light of the COVID-19 pandemic in Singapore, Halimah approved her in-principle for the government's request to draw S$21 billion from the past national reserves, aimed at subsidising wages of 1.9 million workers and preserving jobs and businesses. On 7 April 2020, the Supplementary Supply Bill was revised for the Resilience and Solidarity Budgets and the revised bill was asserted by Halimah on 9 April 2020. On 5 June 2020, the Parliament of Singapore passed the Second Supplementary Supply Bill for the Fortitude Budget, to allow for the government to draw an additional of S$31 billion from the past reserves, aimed at securing employment for those who lost their jobs due to the pandemic as the country loosens restrictions after the circuit breaker.

On 16 June 2020, Halimah assented to the Second Supplementary Supply Bill, which enacted the Second Supplementary Supply Act, to allow the government the additional requested funds to ease the effects of the pandemic. This marks the second time that the past reserves of Singapore were drawn in the financial year of 2020 and it was also the largest amount drawn from the past reserves since Singapore's independence, with the funds totalling S$52 billion. She was the 2nd president to exercise the President's discretionary powers for this purpose, after President S. R. Nathan in 2009 for the financial crisis of 2007–2008.

Personal life
Halimah is married to Mohammed Abdullah Alhabshee, of Arab descent, and they have five children. Mohammed graduated from the National University of Singapore with a Bachelor of Science degree in physics. It was also where he first met Halimah.

Although Halimah is categorised as an Indian Muslim due to her father's descent, she ran for the 2017 presidential election as a Malay candidate and identifies herself as a Malay Muslim.

After being sworn in as president, she was known to be the first president residing in a HDB flat. Her flat was a duplex in Yishun, consisting of one 5-room flat and one 4-room flat joined by demolishing the median wall. Halimah previously stated that she would not be moving out of her HDB flat during her term in office. On 2 October 2017, however, the Ministry of Home Affairs announced that she would be moving out of the public housing apartment, due to security threats identified by security agencies from being the head of state.

Honours

Foreign honours
:
 Collar of the Order of King Abdulaziz (6 November 2019).

Awards
In recognition of her contributions, she was awarded the Berita Harian Achiever of the Year Award in 2001, the Her World Woman of the Year Award in 2003, and the AWARE Heroine Award 2011.

She was also inducted into the Singapore Council of Women's Organisations' Singapore Women's Hall of Fame in 2014.

References

External links

Mdm Halimah Yacob at istana.gov.sg 

|-

1954 births
21st-century women politicians
Female heads of state
Living people
Members of the Parliament of Singapore
National University of Singapore alumni
People's Action Party politicians
Presidents of Singapore
Singaporean Muslims
Singaporean people of Malay descent
Singaporean politicians of Indian descent
Singaporean women in politics
Speakers of the Parliament of Singapore
Women legislative speakers
Women presidents